Laura Kanushu is a Ugandan lawyer, politician and legislator, she represents the people with disabilities in the parliament of Uganda, she Is a member of the National Resistance Movement (NRM) a party under the chairmanship of Yoweri Kaguta Museveni,  president the republic of Uganda.

Career 
Leah Kanushu is a human rights advocate especially for people with disabilities. She is the executive director of Legal Action for People with disabilities (LAPD).

She is an executive member of the Uganda women Parliamentary Association (UWOPA) as the People with Disabilities representative.

In the parliament of Uganda, Kanishu is a member of the committee on rules, privileges and discipline. She is also a member of the Gender Labour and Social development committee.

References 

21st-century Ugandan women politicians
21st-century Ugandan politicians
National Resistance Movement politicians
Women members of the Parliament of Uganda
Members of the Parliament of Uganda
Human rights activists
Year of birth missing (living people)
Living people